Ragoli (Ràgoi in local dialect) was a comune (municipality) in Trentino in the northern Italian region Trentino-Alto Adige/Südtirol, located about  west of Trento. It was merged with Montagne and Preore on January 1, 2016, to form a new municipality, Tre Ville.

Ragoli borders the following municipalities: Tuenno, Dimaro, Pinzolo, Molveno, San Lorenzo in Banale, Stenico, Montagne, Preore, Tione di Trento and Comano Terme.

Ragoli is one of the richest municipalities in Trentino Alto Adige and is well known for his culture, food and rich festivals.

Demographic evolution

References

Cities and towns in Trentino-Alto Adige/Südtirol